Palo Pinto Creek is a river in Eastland, Stephens, and Palo Pinto counties, Texas, United States. It is a tributary of the Brazos River.

The creek rises near the city of Ranger and flows northeast then east past Strawn and Mingus.

See also
List of rivers of Texas
Palo Pinto, Texas

References

USGS Hydrologic Unit Map - State of Texas (1974)

Rivers of Eastland County, Texas
Rivers of Stephens County, Texas
Rivers of Palo Pinto County, Texas
Rivers of Texas